Angelo Calogerà, also known as Domenico Demetrio Calogerà, (circa 7 September 1696, Padua - 29 September 1766, Isola di San Michele) was an Italian Benedictine monk and writer, active in popularizing literature and science.

Life
Angelo was born Domenico Demetrio Calogerà circa September 7, 1696, in Padua, Republic of Venice, to Don Liberale Calogerà of Corfu and Giustina Labarvellon. His father was a member of the aristocratic House of Calogerà and had distinguished himself in the War of Cyprus against the Ottoman Empire in the 1570s; eventually, he settled in Padua, held several administrative posts there, and finally moved to Venice and gained Venetian citizenship. In 1716 Angelo became a Camaldolese monk, initially as librarian of the San Michele di Murano and later as prior of San Giorgio Maggiore.

In 1728, at the peak of Antonio Vallisneri's renown, Calogerà began  publishing "Raccolta d'opuscoli scientifici e filologici", followed in 1755 by "Nuova raccolta d'opuscoli scientifici e filologici ", which continued until its forty-second volume in 1787.  In the first volume, after explicitly recognizing the value of modern culture, he published the Progetto ai letterati d'Italia per iscrivere le loro vite by Giovanni Artico, count of Porcìa, followed by a biography, "Vita di Giambattista Vico scritta da sé medesimo", and then (in the second volume) an autobiography of Pier Jacopo Martello.

In 1762 he and father Giacomo Rebellini founded the journal "Minerva ossia Nuovo giornale dei letterati d'Italia", which ran until 1767 in opposition to the "Frusta letteraria" of Giuseppe Baretti.
Calogerà also wrote "Memorie intorno alla vita di M. Luca De Renaldis vescovo di Trieste consigliere intimo dell'imperadore Massimiliano I e suo ambasciatore a molte corti sovrane d'Europa", stampate a Venezia nel 1753.

References

External links
 

Italian Benedictines
18th-century Italian writers
18th-century Italian male writers
1696 births
1766 deaths
Writers from Padua
Angelo